Although capable of living indoors with humans similarly to cats or dogs, pet skunks are relatively rare, partly due to restrictive laws and the complexity of their care. Pet skunks are mainly kept in the United States, Canada, Germany, the Netherlands, Poland, and Italy.

In the United States, pet skunks can be purchased from licensed animal shelters, non-profit skunk educational organizations such as the American Domestic Skunk Association, or breeders with a permit from the U.S. Department of Agriculture's Animal and Plant Health Inspection Service. Baby skunk availability peaks during springtime, immediately following the skunk mating season. Some large fur farms sell surplus skunks to pet stores.

Skunks are probably best known for their ability to spray foul-smelling fluid as a defense against predators. Most wild skunks spray only when injured or attacked, as a defense mechanism. The mercaptan-emitting scent glands are usually removed in pet skunks at about four weeks of age. Since 2006, this removal practice has been illegal in the UK.

History
Skunks are native to the Americas and are first noted in historical accounts of Christopher Columbus. Skunks were reportedly kept as pets by some Native American nations. Farmers valued domesticated skunks for their ability to kill rodents and other pests. Skunk pelts were also used for coats and frequently passed off as marten fur. Before the 1950s, they were sold under ambiguous names such as "American sable" and "Alaskan sable". The courts finally ruled that the customer must be informed of any purchase that contained skunk parts. The skunk fur market subsequently collapsed. Since then, skunks have been mainly bred as pets, or as animals in show.

In the 20th century, most U.S. states outlawed the keeping of wild animals as part of their efforts to stem the spread of rabies. Only about one-third of states continued to allow domestic skunks. In the 1990s, skunk enthusiasts began establishing mailing lists and organized for skunk law reform. In the 2000s, similar initiatives took place in Canada.

Temperament
Skunks are sensitive, intelligent animals, and like all intelligent animals, temperament varies with each individual. In general, though, skunks have playful temperaments. Skunks tend to be highly curious and will open cupboards that are left unlocked. Some owners have noticed skunks smelling something that was spilled on the carpet long ago, and attempting to dig to find out what is buried there. Like ferrets, their curiosity can lead them into danger, especially if they crawl inside reclining chairs or other machinery.

Skunk care

Handling skunks 
It is better to avoid playing rough with baby skunks, or they may become aggressive and uncooperative as they get older. Bare hands can be used for loving and cuddling the skunk, but a stuffed toy or hand puppet should be used when playing with them due to their sharp teeth and extremely long fangs.

As with all animals, spanking or hitting a skunk is not recommended, since it will cause them to become vengeful or hand-shy. A squirt of water from a spray bottle may be helpful.

Housebreaking
Most skunks can be housebroken  by corner training. After they choose a corner, a litter pan with unscented litter can be placed there. If the skunk misses the litter pan, after cleanup, the area should be saturated with plain white vinegar to remove the scent, so that they will not return to that spot. After the skunk's toilet has been established, it can be moved about four inches a day to a different location. The skunk may or may not follow. If it does not follow, it may be necessary to give in, let the skunk have that corner, and block the view with a chair or bookcase placed in the corner or some other decorative idea.

For covered cat litter boxes, it will probably be necessary to cut a larger opening for the skunk. With any litter pan, bear in mind that regular cleaning is necessary since skunks will avoid a dirty litter box.

Letting skunks outside by themselves is risky since, like ferrets, they lack a homing instinct and can easily get lost. De-scented skunks lack their most powerful defense against predators such as coyotes and foxes. Their nearsightedness also makes them susceptible to becoming roadkill.

Diet
Skunks need a wider variety of food than most pets. They tend to have a voracious appetite, making obesity a common problem. It is important not to overfeed them. Some types of food, such as chocolate, are known to be harmful to almost all animals.

The topic of what to feed skunks is very controversial, according to owners of pet skunks. Mary Kaye Ashley's book, A Comprehensive Guide to Raising a Pet Skunk, recommends a ratio of 50 percent vegetables, 40 percent Skunkie Delight, and 10 percent other whole foods. Skunkie Delight is a homemade blend of a cooked grain (millet, oats, barley, or brown rice), raw ground turkey, eggs, vegetable oil, and a variety of vitamin and mineral powders.

Jane Bone's Skunk Stuff describes a diet of vegetables, fruits, dairy, yogurt, vitamins and minerals, fiber, carbohydrates, and eggs. Skunk Haven disagrees with this diet, and recommends their own sample diet. Skunk expert Mary Kaye Ashley, as well as the American Domestic Skunk Association, also disagree with this diet.

Lynnda Butler, president of Florida Skunks as Pets, believes a small amount of sugar can be beneficial for skunks and recommends an eighth of a graham cracker or vanilla wafer a day. Others (e.g. Skunk Haven) eschew feeding skunks processed sugar altogether, citing the risk of diabetes. Skunk expert Mary Kaye Ashley, as well as the American Domestic Skunk Association, also strongly disagree with the feeding of any form of processed sugar products. Per Ashley, natural sugars (such as a small amount of fruit) can be included in the diet several times a week provided that the skunk does not suffer from hypoglycemia or diabetes.

Skunks generally do not drink a great deal of water, but clean water should always be available.

Veterinary care
Baby skunks from the pet store generally have not had any medical treatment other than scent gland removal, and will require spaying or neutering, shots, and worming. They will need to be tested for coccidia and other protozoa as well as parasites. Skunks also need to have regular yearly checkups. Dr. Frank Krupka and Skunk Haven have developed a blood panel to show if supplements or changes in diet are needed, and recommend a blood panel as part of a yearly check up.

Spaying/neutering
Males should be neutered between 3 and 4 months of age. Females should be spayed between 4 and 6 months of age.

Roundworms
Many skunks have died from roundworms. Baylisascaris columnaris is the species that infests skunks most commonly. Baylisascaris eggs can remain viable in the environment for many years, despite hot or freezing weather or certain harsh chemicals.

Skunks can be infested with roundworms for several weeks before eggs begin to be shed in feces. It is common for new skunks to have roundworms, which may be too early in development to be detected by fecal tests. Skunk experts agree that all new skunks need to be treated for roundworms, and that more than one treatment is needed. Diagnostic parasitologist Matt Bolek recommends that "A de-worming program should probably start at 7–8 weeks of age and de-worm biweekly for 3–4 treatments".

The sources disagree on the frequency with which adult skunks need to be treated for roundworms:
Skunk Haven as well as skunk expert Mary Kaye Ashley and ADSA, Inc. recommend: "After the first series of de-wormings, you should worm every 4–6 months".
 Owners of Pet Skunks recommends "over the counter worm medication given every couple of months and a yearly stool sample check at the vet".
 Skunk expert Jane Bone recommends that all skunks be wormed once a month. However this information is dated and is no longer believe to be the best method of controlling parasites in skunks. De-worming should be done as-needed and not on a routine basis; certain parasites – including roundworms – become resistant to the de-wormers after frequent use.

The consensus is that brand-names Evict and Nemex 2 are good over-the-counter wormers for skunks. A veterinarian may be able to provide more powerful wormers for resistant strains.

General considerations
Overall, caring for skunks is more complicated and challenging than raising other pets due to their rarity. The difficulty in finding a veterinarian with experience treating skunks, the conflicting advice offered by different pet skunk organizations, and the scarcity of scientific knowledge about skunk physiology make it necessary for many skunk owners to fend for themselves. In addition, some skunks – especially those that were mistreated – may bite, refuse to use a litter box, or exhibit other negative behaviors, according to Jane Bone and Skunk Haven.

According to James Furniss, a good skunk owner needs to be a do-it-yourself-er and willing to put in a lot of effort. There are, however, relocation options if a pet skunk does not work out, including skunk shelters.

Rabies
Skunks and other mammals can contract rabies by being bitten by an infected animal or eating the carcass of an infected animal. Although it is quite rare for domesticated skunks to get rabies, there have been cases in which an uninfected pet skunk bit a person and was euthanized by animal control personnel so its brain cells could be tested for rabies.

In the United States, there is no government-approved rabies vaccine or quarantine period for skunks. In Canada, Imrab 3 was used in a study for off-label use as a skunk rabies vaccine and to date it is not approved for skunk use.  If a skunk nips or bites, and the owner can produce proof of vaccination, a 2-week quarantine is required, according to Vivianne Chernoff of Skunks as Pets Canada.

Many countries, such as Japan, require all newly imported skunks to be quarantined. In 2003, The Guardian reported that the UK lacks quarantine kennels licensed to hold skunks.

Legality

Canada
Import permits will not be issued for foxes, raccoons and skunks purchased for import to Canada as a personal pet.

United States
American laws on skunk ownership vary significantly from jurisdiction to jurisdiction. Most states prohibit keeping skunks as pets.

American skunk dealers earning more than $500 a year on the skunk trade are regulated by the United States Department of Agriculture Animal and Plant Health Inspection Service (USDA/APHIS), which has established three classes of licensed skunk dealers. A class A license allows one to breed skunks; a class B license allows one to sell skunks; and a class C license allows one to display them to the public.

Skunk regulations can change from time to time, so prospective skunk owners may want to check with the Fish and Game Commission or Department of Conservation and Natural Resources in their state.

{| border="1" cellpadding="2" cellspacing="0"  style="border:0 none transparent; border-collapse:collapse; text-align:left; vertical-align:top;"
|+Legality of skunk ownership in the United States
|- style="vertical-align: bottom; border-bottom: 3px double #999;"
! State
! Legality
! Statute
|- style="border-bottom:1px solid #999;"
! Alabama
| Illegal
| 
|- style="border-bottom:1px solid #999;"
! Alaska
| Illegal 
|
|- style="border-bottom:1px solid #999;"
! Arkansas
| Illegal 
| 15.18
|- style="border-bottom:1px solid #999;"
! Arizona
| Illegal 
| 
|- style="border-bottom:1px solid #999;"
! California
| Illegal 
|
|- style="border-bottom:1px solid #999;"
! Colorado
| Illegal 
|
|- style="border-bottom:1px solid #999;"
! Connecticut
| Illegal 
|
|- style="border-bottom:1px solid #999;"
! Delaware
| Illegal 
|
|- style="border-bottom:1px solid #999;"
! Florida
| Legal, with permit 
|
|- style="border-bottom:1px solid #999;"
! Georgia
| Illegal
| 
|- style="border-bottom:1px solid #999;"
! Hawaii
| Illegal 
|
|- style="border-bottom:1px solid #999;"
! Idaho
| Illegal
| 
|- style="border-bottom:1px solid #999;"
! Illinois
| Illegal 
|
|- style="border-bottom:1px solid #999;"
! Indiana
| Legal, with permit 
| 
|- style="border-bottom:1px solid #999;"
! Iowa
| Legal 
| 
|- style="border-bottom:1px solid #999;"
! Kansas
| Illegal 
|
|- style="border-bottom:1px solid #999;"
! Kentucky
| Legal in some counties
| 
|- style="border-bottom:1px solid #999;"
! Louisiana
| Illegal 
|
|- style="border-bottom:1px solid #999;"
! Maine
| Illegal 
|
|- style="border-bottom:1px solid #999;"
! Maryland
| Illegal
|  §10-621(b)(1)
|- style="border-bottom:1px solid #999;"
! Massachusetts
| Illegal (since September 2006) 
|
|- style="border-bottom:1px solid #999;"
! Michigan
| Legal with permit; outsidecage must be built;must be bred in Michigan 
| 
|- style="border-bottom:1px solid #999;"
! Minnesota
| Illegal
| 
|- style="border-bottom:1px solid #999;"
! Mississippi
| Illegal 
|
|- style="border-bottom:1px solid #999;"
! Missouri
| Illegal 
| 
|- style="border-bottom:1px solid #999;"
! Montana
| Illegal
| 
|- style="border-bottom:1px solid #999;"
! Nebraska
| Illegal
| 
|- style="border-bottom:1px solid #999;"
! Nevada
| Illegal
| 
|- style="border-bottom:1px solid #999;"
! New Hampshire
| Legal, with permit 
| 
|- style="border-bottom:1px solid #999;"
! New Jersey
| Legal, with permit.
| 
|- style="border-bottom:1px solid #999;"
! New Mexico
| Legal, with permit
| 
|- style="border-bottom:1px solid #999;"
! New York
| Legal with permit, butonly in limited areas.
| 
|- style="border-bottom:1px solid #999;"
! North Carolina
| Illegal
| 
|- style="border-bottom:1px solid #999;"
! North Dakota
| Illegal
| 
|- style="border-bottom:1px solid #999;"
! Ohio
| Legal, with permit 
| 
|- style="border-bottom:1px solid #999;"
! Oklahoma
| Legal, but must have importpermit and health certificate. 
| 
|- style="border-bottom:1px solid #999;"
! Oregon
| Legal, if bought outside ofOregon, with import permitand health certificates.Illegal to sell or trade skunks. 
| 
|- style="border-bottom:1px solid #999;"
! Pennsylvania
| Legal, with permit 
| 
|- style="border-bottom:1px solid #999;"
! Rhode Island
| Illegal 
|
|- style="border-bottom:1px solid #999;"
! South Carolina
| Permit required since 2004;previously owned remain legal,but no more will be permitted.Illegal to buy or sell skunks.
| 
|- style="border-bottom:1px solid #999;"
! South Dakota
| Legal without permit;only one skunk per person. 
| 
|- style="border-bottom:1px solid #999;"
! Tennessee
| Illegal
|  TC 70-4-208
|- style="border-bottom:1px solid #999;"
! Texas
| Illegal 
|
|- style="border-bottom:1px solid #999;"
! Utah
| Illegal
|  R657-3
|- style="border-bottom:1px solid #999;"
! Vermont
| Illegal 
| 
|- style="border-bottom:1px solid #999;"
! Virginia
| Illegal
| 
|- style="border-bottom:1px solid #999;"
! WashingtonState
| Illegal
| 
|- style="border-bottom:1px solid #999;"
! West Virginia
| Legal, with permit 
| 
|-  style="border-bottom:1px solid #999;"
! Wisconsin
| Legal, with permit 
| 
|- style="border-bottom:3px double #999;"
! Wyoming
| Legal (classified as predatoryanimals; as such may be kept aspets, with no license required)
| 
|- style="border-bottom:3px double #999;"
! Washington, DC  
| Illegal
| 
|}

Politics

Several activists are seeking legalization of pet skunks in the jurisdictions where they are currently banned. Their activities have included supporting bills and testifying before legislative panels.

In 2001, Del. George W. Owings III introduced a bill in the Maryland legislature to legalize pet skunks in that state.  Several officials spoke in opposition to the measure before the Environmental Matters committee.  Mike Slattery, testifying on behalf of the Maryland Department of Natural Resources, criticized the idea, saying it would encourage "Bambi syndrome", the tendency to domesticate wild animals. State health officials pointed out that the bill, HB 91, required rabies vaccinations when there is no federally approved rabies vaccine for skunks.

Rabies has, in fact, been a key issue in skunk-related legislative debates. Since wild skunks account for the second-largest number of rabies cases in wildlife in the US, many legislators have been reluctant to allow domestic skunks without an appropriate vaccine on the market. In addition to the problems at the state level, federal organizations set the policy for dealing with accidental skunk bites, which currently requires euthanizing the animal so rabies tests can be performed.

In February 1990, a rabies vaccine called Imrab 3 was approved for ferrets.  Many skunk advocates believe the vaccine would also be effective for skunks, and are pushing to have it tested for this use. They also favor clinical tests to determine the appropriate quarantine/observation period in case of a skunk bite. This would provide a way to test skunks without the need for euthanasia. According to Aspen Skunk Rabies Research, part of the reason that this research has not been done yet is the high cost of these clinical trials, which would be difficult for drug companies to recoup.

In the early 2000s, People for Domestic Skunks gathered more than 4,000 signatures for its Nationwide Domestic Skunk Petition.  According to Aspen Skunk Rabies Research, Inc., the effectiveness of petitions is limited by the fact that many important decisions are made by national organizations.  The National Association of State Public Health Veterinarians' annual Rabies Compendium sets the procedures for what to do if a skunk bites someone.

In Canada, Mike Freeman of Freeman's Exotic Skunks was ordered in 1999 by the Ontario Ministry of Natural Resources to destroy his entire stock of 100 adult and 700 baby skunks. Although the agency had approved his farm in 1997, the 1998 Fish and Wildlife Act outlawed breeding. Natural Resources Minister John Snobelen ultimately gave him six months to sell or give away the animals in the U.S., saying, "No one wants to see these animals euthanized and that won't have to happen".

In the United Kingdom, the Royal College of Veterinary Surgeons recommended in 1987 that elective skunk scent gland removal be classified as an unacceptable procedure.

Organizations
Pet skunk organizations can be a source of useful advice for skunk owners. Some organizations also hold annual skunk shows. Prizes are awarded in categories such as Prettiest Tail, Friendliest, Most Talented, etc.

The American Domestic Skunk Association provides education for skunk owners and the public, 24-hour phone and web support, adoptions, rescue, rehabilitation, shows and events, as well as newsletters, a skunk care guide and a research program.

Owners of Pet Skunks is a non-profit organization whose mission is to better the lives of captive-bred skunks. OOPS has an annual picnic and publishes a quarterly newsletter containing informative articles about skunks, human interest stories, puzzles, information on skunk related laws, and regional and national events.

Skunk Haven Skunk Rescue, Shelter, and Education, Inc. is based in Ohio and provides 24/7 phone and web support, an international network of rescues and rescue supporters, education for new owners, and exhibitions and education programs. The shelter has Federal USDA/APHIS and State permits to accept surrendered pet skunks into the shelter and to perform adoptions nationally; Skunk Haven also maintains a regularly updated list of legal states.

Skunks as Pets has chapters in Alabama, Florida, Georgia, Indiana, Kentucky, Minnesota, North Dakota, Mississippi, New Jersey, Ohio, Oregon, Texas, Canada, and Germany.

Footnotes

References

Domesticated animals
Mammals as pets
Animals in captivity
Pet